is the 33rd single by Japanese entertainer Miho Nakayama. Written by Masato Odake and Maria, the single was released on February 16, 1996, by King Records.

Background and release
"Thinking About You (Anata no Yoru wo Tsutsumitai)" was used as the ending theme of NTV's  at the request of free announcer Yoshiko Sakurai.

"Thinking About You (Anata no Yoru wo Tsutsumitai)" peaked at No. 13 on Oricon's weekly singles chart and sold over 107,000 copies.

Track listing

Charts

References

External links

1995 songs
1996 singles
Japanese-language songs
Miho Nakayama songs
King Records (Japan) singles